Yang Ching-huang (born 10 August 1960) is a Taiwanese singer and actor. He released 5 Mandopop albums in the 1980s and 1990s.

Selected filmography

Film

Television series

Awards and nominations

External links

1960 births
Living people
20th-century Taiwanese male actors
21st-century Taiwanese male actors
Taiwanese male film actors
Taiwanese male television actors
People from Changhua County